Dalbergia sambesiaca is a species of legume in the family Fabaceae.
It is found only in Mozambique.

References

Sources

sambesiaca
Flora of Mozambique
Data deficient plants
Endemic flora of Mozambique
Taxonomy articles created by Polbot